The Robertson Family Farm, in or near Whiteville, Tennessee, was listed on the National Register of Historic Places in 2007.  It then included four contributing buildings and a contributing site.

It was deemed significant as a rare surviving example of a farm operated by the same African-American family for over 100 years.  It was started by Crawford Robertson who was born a slave in Arkansas;  it was operated in 2007 by grandson Evelyn Robertson with help of a cousin and a lessee.

References

Historic districts on the National Register of Historic Places in Tennessee
Buildings and structures completed in 1906
Hardeman County, Tennessee
1906 establishments in Tennessee